Español de Cádiz was a football team from Cádiz, Andalusia. They played in the Andalusia Championship between 1915 and 1928. Their best performances was to win its first edition of 1915–16.
They had the right to play in the 1916 Copa del Rey after winning the Andalusia Championship, but did not inscribe for the tournament.

References

Cádiz
Defunct football clubs in Andalusia